"Chop chop" is a phrase first noted in the interaction between Cantonese and English people in British-occupied south China. It spread through Chinese workers at sea and was adopted by British seamen. "Chop chop" means "hurry" and suggests that something should be done now and without delay. According to the Oxford English Dictionary, the word "chopsticks" originates from this same root.

The term may have its origins in the South China Sea, as a Pidgin English version of the Cantonese term chok chok (jyutping: cuk1 cuk1) which in turn is similar in usage to the Mandarin term k'wâi-k'wâi or may have originated from Malay.

See also
Chinese Pidgin English

References

External links

Nautical slang